Coppejans is a surname. Notable people with the surname include:

Kimmer Coppejans (born 1994), Belgian tennis player
Paul Coppejans (1933–2018), Belgian pole vaulter